ESL Pro League Season 9 (shortened as EPL Season 9) was a Counter-Strike: Global Offensive tournament run by ESL. It was the ninth season of the ESL Pro League. Teams from five continents – North America, Europe, Asia, Australia, and South America – competed in four leagues to attempt to qualify for the Finals. The regular season started on April 12, 2019, and ended in June 2019. This season was also the fourth tournament of the Intel Grand Slam Season 2. The EPL Finals took place in Montpellier, France.

The finals for ESL Pro League Season 9 featured G2 Esports, which defeated FaZe Clan and NRG Esports en route to the grand finals, and Team Liquid, which defeated Astralis and mousesports. The season concluded with Team Liquid defeating G2 Esports three games to one to earn its inaugural Pro League title. This is the inaugural that a North American team has won a premier title in Europe.

Format
This season introduced a vastly different format than other seasons. Instead like last season, which had five leagues, there will only be four leagues: Europe, Americas, Asia, and Oceania.

Europe's league will feature sixteen teams, thirteen of which were automatically invited based on their top thirteen placement from last season. One team qualified by winning season 29 of Europe's Premier Division and another two teams qualified through the relegation phase. The Americas league also had sixteen teams, but instead of just teams based in North America, it will also feature Latin American teams. This league will feature the top nine teams from North America's season 8, the winner of season 29 of North America's Premier Division, and two teams from the relegation phase; there will also be four Latin American teams. Asia's league will feature four teams from the Greater China area and four teams from Southeast Asia. Oceania's league will feature eight teams. Both Asia and Oceania's regular seasons will remain online.

The biggest change came with Europe's and the America's leagues featuring offline regular season play. This format will be similar to a mix of the ELEAGUE Season 1 group stage and the ESL One Katowice 2015 group stage. Four teams at a time will fly out to an ESL studio and play their matches there. For all four leagues, teams will be divided into groups of four teams and play a best of three robin round. For Europe, there were four groups. The winners of each group automatically moved on to the Finals while the teams that placed second and third moved to a second group stage. Fourth place teams were eliminated. In the second group stage, there were two groups of four teams. The top two teams in each group qualified for the finals. For the Americas, the first group stage was the same, but for the second group stage, only one team from each group moved on to the Finals. For Asia and Oceania, there were two groups in the first stage. The top two teams moved on to the second stage. There, only one team from each region qualified for the Finals in France.

Qualifiers

Season 8 Relegation

Europe Relegation
Due to Europe's league expanding to sixteen teams, Ninjas in Pyjamas and Fnatic were automatically invited to this season rather than playing in this relegation phase and AGO Esports played in the relegation phase instead of being automatically sent down to the Premier Division. In addition, Epsilon eSports was unable to play in relegation, so OpTic, which had the best record in Premier, took its place.

North America Relegation

Teams

Notes

Europe

Stage 1

Group A

mousesports looked strong in its group stage matches, as it only dropped one map out of the six it played. OpTic Gaming also had a strong performance as it was the only team to take a map off of mousesports. North struggled throughout the group stage, but two close map wins against the former players of Space Soldiers allowed the Danes to stay alive. ex-Space Soldiers continued to struggle after leaving Space Soldiers, even under the leadership of veteran Turkish-Australian player Yaman "yam" Ergenekon.

Group B

Notes

FaZe Clan was clearly the strongest team is it had almost no problem sweeping up the competition. Heroic, devils.one, and Ninjas in Pyjamas were all in a deadlock, each winning only one series. The very close loss to devils.one would come back to haunt Ninjas in Pyjamas as the Swedes were placed last in the group as Heroic and devils.one beat out the tiebreaker. Heroic defeating devils.one in a nail-biter, double overtime third map allowed the Danes to escape with the second seed; had Heroic lost to devils.one, it would have been in last place.

Group C

G2 Esports continued to look for a consistent, winning pattern, and it did so in this group, as it took down Natus Vincere (Na`Vi) and Fnatic to top group C. Na`Vi was not shaken up by the G2 loss as it went on to take down Fnatic. Fnatic, arguably the most decorated team in CS:GO, struggled, but defeating Windigo Gaming allowed the Swedes to stay alive. Windigo had strong performances prior, but the Bulgarians struggled to take the game to the finish line, as four of its losses were within four rounds of victory.

Group D

The favorites Astralis cleaned up group D with relative ease. HellRaisers and BIG also advanced fairly easily, as ex-3DMAX struggled massively, failing to even win one map.

Stage 2

Group E

Notes

Fnatic turned things around after losing to OpTic Gaming in Group E, defeating HellRaisers and sweeping Aristocracy. On the other hand, OpTic did start off quite well, but Aristocracy and HellRaisers both swept the Danish team, taking OpTic out of the running of the EPL S9 title. The early HellRaisers victory over Aristocracy would turn out to the be decider for the final Group E spot in the finals, as Fnatic and HellRaisers moved on.

Group F

Like Fnatic, North also completely turned things around as it topped Group F, going 3–0, including defeating Na`Vi. Na`Vi was a favorite to head to the Finals, but Heroic upsetting the CIS squad on the last day of European regular season play in a very close third map was the decider, sending Na`Vi home. BIG had some very close maps, but the German team could not pull out a map win.

Europe standings
Europe's final standings are below. The top eight move on to the Finals and qualify for next season. 9th to 12th do not qualify for the Finals, but are invited to next season. The bottom four teams will have to play in a relegation phase for a spot in next season. Each team's in-game leader is shown first.

Americas

Stage 1

Group A

Notes

NRG Esports, and Renegades all tied in series wins, while INTZ eSports failed to find even a map win. NRG would book a spot in the finals since it took a map off of the Renegades.  was seeded second based on defeating the Renegades.

Group B

Team Liquid had a fairly easy time in the group stage, as the top ranked team in the world only suffered a loss to compLexity Gaming (coL), only to stomp coL in the next two maps. The newly formed Lazarus Esports gained good experience against some notable North American teams, but the inexperience proved to be too much to overcome. Ghost Gaming and coL moved on to stage 2 while Liquid went straight to the Finals.

Group C

Notes

Luminosity Gaming topped group C in a huge surprise, as the team was not even supposed to be in Pro League to begin with. Team Envy continued to struggle with its lineup, even with its new addition of Sam "s0m" Oh. Envy bottomed out the group while MIBR and Cloud9 stayed alive.

Group D

The new Denial Esports lineup struggled as it went 0–3 to the other South American teams. DETONA Gaming went straight into the Finals after taking down every team it faced while Isurus Gaming and Infinity Esports would go on to face a tough task in going against experienced North American teams.`

Stage 2

Group E

MIBR readjusted and took down every one in Group E, with only a slip up against coL. Renegades nearly made the Finals, but the loss to MIBR on the last day was the decider. Isurus upset coL to round out Group E and earned an extra 1,000.

Group F

Like MIBR, Cloud9 topped its group, defeating Ghost on the last day despite its recent struggles.

Americas standings
The Americas' final standings are below. The top six move on to the Finals and qualify for next season. 7th to 12th do not qualify for the Finals, but are invited to next season. The bottom four teams will have to play in a relegation phase for a spot in next season. Each team's in-game leader is shown first.

Asia

Stage 1

East Asia

Notes

5Power Gaming started very strong by defeating favorites TyLoo while MVP PK took down the second seeded ViCi Gaming. However, 5Power's success would not last long as it fell to ViCi and MVP PK was downed by TyLoo. TyLoo and MVP PK would lock their spots for the Asia finals after taking down ViCi and 5Power, respectively. on the last day.

Southeast Asia

The two Thai teams overcame B.O.O.T-dream[S]cape to secure spots in the Asia finals. Entity Gaming from India struggled as it only garnered eleven rounds in four maps before eventually forfeiting its last match to ALPHA Red.

Stage 2

The two East Asian team proved to be superior to the Southeast Asian teams, but it was TyLoo to take the Finals spot over MVP PK in a close three game set. Lucid Dream took down ALPHA Red to place third.

Asia standings
The Asian final standings are below. The top team moved on to the Finals and qualifies for next season. 2nd to 6th do not qualify for the Finals, but are invited to next season. The bottom two teams will have to play in a relegation phase for a spot in next season. Each team's in-game leader is shown first.

Oceania

Stage 1

Group A

Notes

ORDER had an easy time against its competitors as it went 3–0. Athletico Esports was able to steal away the second seed based on having more map wins than either Breakaway Esports or Paradox Gaming.

Group B

The favorites Grayhound Gaming had an even easier time than ORDER as it cruised to a 3-0 scoreline without dropping a map. Chiefs Esports Club defeated Avant Gaming on the first day of group B to take the second seed while Ground Zero Gaming did not even take a single map.

Stage 2

With Athletico not able to make the Oceania finals, it was a quick group. As expected, Grayhound topped the group and booked a Finals spot without dropping a map as Chiefs and ORDER were sent home.

Oceania standings
Oceania's final standings are below. The top team moved on to the Finals and qualifies for next season. 2nd to 6th do not qualify for the Finals, but are invited to next season. The bottom two teams will have to play in a relegation phase for a spot in next season. Each team's in-game leader is shown first.

Finals
The finalized teams are shown below. Each team's HLTV.org ranking for June 17, 2019 – the final rankings before the Finals – is shown next to the team.

Broadcast talent
Desk host
 Tres "stunna" Saranthus
Stage host
 Olivier Morin
Interviewer
 James Banks
Commentators
 Tom "Tombizz" Bissmire
 Anders Blume
 Henry "HenryG" Greer
 Jason "JKaplan" Kaplan
 Jason "moses" O'Toole
 Jack "Jacky" Peters
 Alex "Machine" Richardson
 Sudhen "Bleh" Wahengbam
Analysts
 Chad "SPUNJ" Burchill
 Mathieu "Maniac" Quiquerez
 Jacob "Pimp" Winneche
Observers
 Jake "Jak3y" Elton
 Alex "Rushly" Rush

Group stage

Group A
G2 Esports was barely able to escape a scare from Grayhound Gaming and NRG Esports took down Fnatic in a close map. Astralis continued to roll as it took down the struggling Cloud9 while Heroic took advantage of DETONA Gaming's inexperience to bump the Brazilians down with relative ease. NRG then took down G2 in a very close three game set, with the latter two games going into overtime. Astralis had no trouble taking out its compatriots in Heroic to move on. Grayhound put up a fight against Fnatic, but the Swedes prevailed in the end while Cloud9 had little trouble putting away DETONA. Heroic then eliminated Fnatic in a series that went three games while G2 survived against Cloud9 in two close games. NRG upset Astralis in the winner's finals to top group A and earn a bye for the playoffs. In the loser's side, G2 took down Heroic, with Kenny "kennyS" Schrub leading the way for the French.

Group B
FaZe Clan edged out TyLoo in the group B opener while North upset Team Liquid on Dust II. mousesports continued to look strong with a win over MIBR while HellRaisers made an all European winner's side with a win over Luminosity Gaming. North fought hard, but FaZe managed to take the series over the Danes in a third map overtime victory. mousesports easily took down HellRaisers to set the winner's side. TyLoo could not get anything done against Liquid as the Americans easily moved on while MIBR got revenge against Luminosity. HellRaisers gave Liquid a scare, but Liquid somehow prevailed and came back in the third map from an 11–14 deficit to a 16–14 win. MIBR easily took down North in the first map, but North came back in the second map; in the third map, MIBR had to rally a bit after being down most of the match to secure the series, with heroics from Fernando "fer" Alvarenga. Finn "karrigan" Andersen took out the team that kicked him in FaZe to help mousesports secure the first seed in group B. On the loser's side, Liquid continued to have success against MIBR in two maps to secure a spot in the playoffs.

Playoffs

Round of 6
Nikola "NiKo" Kovač had a very strong game for FaZe Clan, but the rest of his team could not get anything going, as G2 Esports took advantage of that, led by Lucas "Lucky" Chastang's 21 kills and 6 assists. FaZe's star players Håvard "rain" Nygaard and Ladislav "GuardiaN" Kovács struggled massively as they had the fewest kills on the server. The second game on Dust II ended in a close first half, with G2 leading 9–6. However, vintage performances from Richard "shox" Papillon and kennyS spurred G2 to running away with the second half and eliminating FaZe.

Astralis versus Team Liquid was the story during Astralis's winning era, as the North Americans almost always failed to crack the Astralis puzzle. After a Danish 12-3 first half, Liquid brought it all the way to 15–12, only to have Astralis close it out and it looked like Astralis was going to run away with it again. However, in the second map, Liquid carried that second half momentum from the first map to a 14-1 first half on the second map, despite Nicolai "dev1ce" Reedtz's 23 kills to lead the server. Liquid would tie up the series. The third map saw Astralis take a 11-4 halftime lead, but nine unanswered rounds by Liquid suddenly put the Americans up 13–11. Astralis would take two more rounds, but Liquid took out the Danes to headed to the semifinals, as Jonathan "EliGE" Jablonowski lead the way with 28 kills.

Semifinals
The first semifinal match was between NRG, still fielding daps, against G2 Esports, on Dust 2.  The French side started out with a dominating 8–1 lead on the T side.  However, NRG managed to win the last 6 rounds in the half due to back-to-back 1v1s by Vincent "Brehze" Cayonte to end up with a 8-7 scoreline favoring G2.  NRG took the momentum after winning the pistol round on the T side, and ended up taking 4 rounds in a row.  However, G2 eventually found their footing on the CT side and the map ended 16-12 for the French side, with kennyS having a great performance of 28 kills.  On the second map, Train, NRG had a dominant T-side and ended up continuing this into the 2nd half, despite an Ace by kennyS on the 2nd pistol round.  The decider for the series was Overpass.  NRG started out 2–0 on their T side, but they ended up not getting much more than that due to some key holds from François "AmaNEk" Delauney and the half ended up 12–3, favouring G2.  Despite an effort from NRG in the second half, G2 ended up closing out the series and claiming a spot in the Grand Finals.

The second semifinal match was between Team Liquid, the #1 team in the world at that time, going up against the up-and-coming international roster of Mousesports.  Mousesports started out Overpass by chaining some rounds off the back of Finn "karrigan" Andersen's quad-kill on the CT-side.  However, Team Liquid would eventually run away with a dominant 10-5 T-half, which included a last second knife kill on the defuser on the last round by Nicholas "nitr0" Cannella.  The North American side ended up closing out their map pick quite comfortably at a 16–8 score line.  On Nuke, Liquid looked poised to close out the series with a 12-3 CT half, but Mousesports ended up draggin the map to Overtime off of an impressive performance from Özgür "woxic" Eker who managed to keep Mouz in contention with a quad kill.  Despite his efforts, Liquid won the map and match in overtime, and advanced to the finals to face G2.

Finals

Finals standings
Between the end of the regular season and the Finals, a few changes took place.

FaZe Clan replace Dauren "AdreN" Kystaubayev, who was with FaZe on a trial basis, with legendary Virtus.pro player Filip "NEO" Kubski.

TyLoo release Kevin "xccurate" Susanto from the team and acquire Wing Hei "Freeman" Cheung from ViCi Gaming. TyLoo also signed free agent Zhenghao "DANK1NG" Lv as a sixth player.

compLexity Gaming released Peter "stanislaw" Jarguz from the team. NRG Esports then signed stanislaw to replace Damian "daps" Steele. However, under ESL rules, stanislaw is not able to participate in the Finals since he playing for compLexity during the season, so NRG was forced to use daps for the Finals.

References

ESL Pro League
2019 in esports